The Hudson Union Society is a members-only institution based in New York City that runs weekly celebrity showcases.  The Hudson Union events, generally hosted by co-founder Joseph Pascal, feature special guests and audience interaction. Since its inception, the Hudson Union has hosted over 700 celebrities.

History
The Hudson Union was created by Joseph Pascal  and Louise Mensch, with the support of Princess Badiya of Jordan. All graduates of the University of Oxford in the U.K., they took inspiration from the Oxford Union.

Notable speakers
The Hudson Union has hosted a variety of speakers, including:

 Choreographer and singer Paula Abdul
 Actress Jessica Alba
 Former US Secretary of State Madeleine Albright
 Musician and actor Kevin Bacon
 Actor Alec Baldwin
 Singer Tony Bennett
 Broadcast journalist Tom Brokaw
 Jazz musician Peter Brötzmann
 Bounty hunter Duane Chapman "Dog"
 News anchor Katie Couric
 Singer David Crosby
 Actor and Comedian Billy Crystal
 Singer Billy Ray Cyrus
 Indiana governor Mitch Daniels
 Chairman of the Joint Chiefs of Staff General Martin Dempsey
 Rapper, model and actress Rah Digga
 Singer Gloria Estefan
 Former US Senator Russ Feingold
 Actor James Franco
 Comedian and actress Whoopi Goldberg
 Former US Vice President Al Gore
 Secretary of Defense Chuck Hagel
 Conservative host Sean Hannity
 Actor Neil Patrick Harris
 Actress Anne Hathaway
 Actor and director Philip Seymour Hoffman
 US Senator John Kerry
 Political commentator Chris Matthews
 Political commentator Bill O'Reilly
 Television and radio presenter Steve Penk
 Former US Secretary of State Colin Powell
 Former US Secretary of Defense Donald Rumsfeld
 Actor William Shatner
 Former TV presenter Lorne Spicer
 Comedian and television host Jon Stewart
 Actor and writer Stanley Tucci
 Boxer Mike Tyson
 CEO of HP Meg Whitman
 Youngest winner of the Nobel Peace Prize Malala Yousafzai
 Actor Steven Schirripa

References

External links
 Hudson Union Society - official site

Clubs and societies in New York City